Gabriele Bonci is an Italian chef who specializes in pizza al taglio.

Early life 
Bonci was born to Severina and Sergio. His mother's family were farmers in Agro Pontino. His father's family ran a trattoria in Cupramontana. He became interested in baking after observing his mother leaving dough to rise beneath a radiator when the family left the house to attend church.

Bonci recalls every day on the way home from school he would stop for supplì, fried balls of risotto, and a slice of tomato pizza. He attended catering school.

Bonci attended cooking school against his family's wishes. At sixteen he worked in a trattoria in Abruzzo. At eighteen he worked in London. He returned to Rome and worked at Convivio, which at the time had two Michelin stars.

Career 
After graduating from cooking school, Bonci worked at Rome's Simposio restaurant and eventually became chef there.

In 2003 he opened  near Vatican City, called by The Atlantic "Rome's most revered pizza al taglio (pizza by the slice) joint" and by Katie Parla and Kristin Gill, authors of Tasting Rome, "Rome's landmark pizza by the slice joint." He opened a Chicago pizzeria with American partner Risk Tasman in 2017.

He experimented with fried pasta balls similar to the fried balls of risotto he'd grown up eating. He became well-known for his pizzamaking and was named "Michelangelo of Pizza" by Vogue. He was invited on a television program, . He became a regular.

Elisia Menuni developed a logo Bonci used, and Bonci developed a character around it, Bonci. Bonci became a celebrity chef in Italy to the point a jingle, "Bonci, Bonci, bon-bon-bon", was used to introduce him for his appearances. In 2011 he began teaching at Rome's Tricolore cooking school.

According to Matt Goulding, Bonci "set off a small revolution in the Italian baking and pizza world". Bonci worked with sourdough bakers Richard Hart and Vanessa Kimbell in 2019, writing the forward to Vanessa Kimbell's bestselling book "Il pane di pasta madre" 

The pressure of sustaining the persona caused him to retreat from the public view. As of the early 2020s he says he considers himself not a pizzaiolo but a farmer.

Pizza Hero 
Bonci had a television program, . In each episode, he evaluated the work of three pizza ovens, choosing two to compete for the opportunity to have their stores remodeled. It filmed in cities around Italy.

Cookbook 
In 2013 Bonci's Pizza:Seasonal Recipes From Rome’s Legendary Pizzarium was published.

Approach

Ingredients 
Bonci focuses on higher-quality ingredients such as flour from Piedmont artisanal producer Mulino Marino. He developed a blend of grains which he calls pane di semper which creates a "light, delicate" crust. He includes whole grains, which produce more flavor, and high-gluten flour, which helps whole-grain flours rise well. Grains he works with include whole wheat, whole grain farro, and spelt. He uses a wild-caught yeast. According to Nancy Harmon Jenkins he incorporates olive oil, which is unusual for pizza dough.

Technique 
Bonci uses breadmaking techniques, such as a long-fermentation method at low temperatures, which encourages the development of complex flavors in the dough. He does not knead.

Recognition 
The Atlantic called Bonci "Italy's foremost celebrity baker". The Los Angeles Times called him "Rome's phenomenal pizza master". The Washington Post said, "what do you call him? chef? baker? pizzamaker fanatic? genius?" La Repubblica said that with Stefano Bonilli he had "inaugurated an era". Anthony Bourdain joked that in order to get Bonci's pizza, people should, "Leave your family, abandon your children". Mashed said he'd "reinvented the Roman idea of pizza".  called him "Italy's greatest baker".  called him "The king of Roman pizza" and said "Traditionally, food critics call his preparations not pizzas, but actual works of art". They credited him with raising Roman pizza to national importance. Parla and Gill called him a "legendary baker". Goulding called him a "virtuoso". Barbara Caracciolo credited him with making pizza al taglio "internationally respected".

Netflix included him in their Chef's Table documentary series.

Personal life 
Bonci describes himself as a "big child. Big and round. Beautifully round". He started to cook at 14 and says that from then on he knew he wanted to cook and never wanted to do anything else. He has said that he became confused between where the dividing line between Gabriele Bonci and the character Bonci was, calling the character his "clown costume" and the jingle "the red nose". In 2022 he describes having to kill the character in order to himself survive. At the time he weighed almost  . He decided to have sleeve gastrectomy.

References

Further reading 

 
 
 
 

Italian chefs
Living people
Italian restaurateurs
Year of birth missing (living people)